The Julia Dean was the name of two river steamboats on the Mississippi River.

Steamer Julia Dean
Sternwheel packet, wooden hull, built at McKeesport, Pennsylvania, 1850, 117 tons.  138.5' x 24' x 3.8'.  Ran the Pittsburgh-Zanesville trade from 1850 to 1853.  Built for N.W. and George Graham of N.W. Graham & Company, Zanesville, OH.  Her masters include Capts. Charles Galligher, Joseph McVay, J.J. Binning, Henry S. Pierce and George Russell.

Inasmuch as two boats of this name were built in 1850, the accounts of their careers have become tangled.  One of them was on the upper Mississippi 1855–1856, noticed at Saint Paul both years.  The other (presumably this one) was lost in a collision with the Rainbow at Mount Vernon, on April 26, 1857, with loss of 5 lives.

News Articles regarding the Str. Julia Dean 

New Albany Daily Ledger, April 28, 1857
 
The steamers Julia Dean and Rainbow came in collision on Sunday morning, in the Ohio River, near Mount Vernon. The former was sunk, by which five lives were lost. The following are the particulars, derived from a letter from Mr. W.W.Houston, clerk of the Rainbow:
On the 26th day of April, 1857, about the hour of 3 o'clock in the morning, the steamer Rainbow, while ascending the Ohio river, opposite Slim Island, about four miles below Mt. Vernon, Indiana came in collision with the Julia Dean, bound down.
 
The Rainbow sounded her whistle twice for the larboard side, and was answered by one sound of the whistle from the Dean; the Rainbow was stopped and backed, and then came the collision, the Julia Dean striking the Rainbow about the stem on the starboard side, breaking a hole in the Rainbow and sinking herself immediately. The Rainbow was instantly landed to protect those on board, and finding she was making no water of any consequence, she proceeded to the wreck of the Julia Dean. The steamer Belfast being a short distance behind the Rainbow, arrived at the wreck first. The Rainbow made fast to and towed the wreck ashore.
 
We then proceeded on our trip, but upon examination, finding that the Rainbow made water very freely, in consequence of the spray being thrown above the break in the hull, we landed and repaired the damage temporarily and then continued our trip.
 
Some three or four of the deck hands and fireman are supposed to have been drowned. She had but a small crew and only three passengers. Her principal freight was 200 barrels salt and about 20 tons marble.
 
The Julia Dean had recently been purchased by Capts. John Cummins and Pinkney Varble, for $3,500, and had no insurance on her. She left Louisville last week for Evansville and the Wabash with 200 barrels of salt which had been purchased by the owners. At Evansville a lot of groceries, iron, and twenty tons of marble had been taken on board. Four of the crew and one cabin passenger were drowned. The latter got on at Evansville. The crew shipped at Louisville; their names have not yet been ascertained. One of them resided in Portland, where he leaves a family.

New Albany Daily Ledger April 28, 1857 
The Rainbow has laid up to repair.
New Albany Daily Ledger April 29, 1857
The Rainbow is undergoing repairs at the Portland wharf, having received but slight damage by her collision with the Julia Dean.
New Albany Daily Ledger  April 29, 1857
The Louisville Courier learns that seven men were drowned by the loss of the Julia Dean in the collision with the Rainbow. Six o them were of the crew, and the seventh one was a passenger who got on the boat at Evansville.  The names of the crew were: William Collins, John Howdew, Chris. Sharper, Charles Baker, Richard Birmingham, and William Browder.

See also
River steamboats
Riverboat

References

External links
 riverboatdaves.com, riverboats

Paddle steamers
Ships built in Pittsburgh